"The Lucky One" is a song performed by Estonian singer Uku Suviste that represented Estonia in the Eurovision Song Contest 2021. The backing vocalist off-stage during Suviste's live performance at the Eurovision was Kaarel Orumägi.

Eurovision Song Contest

The song was selected to represent Estonia in the Eurovision Song Contest 2021, after winning Eesti Laul, the music competition that selects Estonia's entries for the Eurovision Song Contest. The semi-finals of the 2021 contest featured the same line-up of countries as determined by the draw for the 2020 contest's semi-finals. Estonia was placed into the second semi-final, held on 20 May 2021, and performed in the first half of the show. It failed to progress to the final.

References

2021 singles
Eurovision songs of 2021
Eurovision songs of Estonia
2021 songs
Uku Suviste songs
Songs written by Sharon Vaughn